Thoothukudi District is one of the 38 districts of Tamil Nadu state in southern India. The district was formed by bifurcation of Tirunelveli district on 20 October 1986. Thoothukudi is the district headquarters and largest city of the district. The district is known for fishing as well as pearl cultivation, with an abundance of pearls being found in the seas offshore. Thoothukudi district has many historical sites such as Adichanallur and the ancient trade port of Korkai.

Geography 
Thoothukudi district is situated in the south-eastern corner of Tamil Nadu. It is bounded by the districts of Virudhunagar on the north, Ramanathapuram on the north-east, Tirunelveli on the west and south-west, Tenkasi on the north-west and Gulf of Mannar on the east and southeast.

Demographics

According to 2011 census, Thoothukudi district had a population of 1,750,176 with a sex-ratio of 1,023 females for every 1,000 males, much above the national average of 929. A total of 183,763 were under the age of six, constituting 93,605 males and 90,158 females. It has a large numbers of Nadars (Thiruchendur, Sathankulam, Thoothukudi, Eral), Appanad Maravars (Kovilpatti, Tiruvaikuntam, Ottapidaram, Kayatharu), Vellalars (Ettayapuram, Ottapidaram),Devendra Kula velalars(Thoothukudi, Kovilpatti, Vilathikulam, Ootaipidaram), Nayakars/Naidu (Kovilpatti and Vilathikulam) and Parathars (Thoothukudi and Tiruchendur). Scheduled Castes and Scheduled Tribes accounted for 19.88% and 0.28% of the population, respectively, mostly in Ottapidaram and Puthiyamputhur. The average literacy of the district was 77.12%, compared to the national average of 72.99%. The district had a total of 462,010 households. There were a total of 748,095 workers, comprising 44,633 cultivators, 161,418 main agricultural labourers, 17,872 in house hold industries, 433,524 other workers, 90,648 marginal workers, 3,882 marginal cultivators, 39,226 marginal agricultural labourers, 4,991 marginal workers in household industries and 42,549 other marginal workers.

Water bodies
There are no large reservoirs in this district so the Papanasam and Manimuthar dams located in the Tirunelveli district in the Thamirabarani River's flow are the main sources of irrigation. Other than the Thamirabarani River, the river Vaipar in Vilathikulam taluk, the river Karumeni which traverses through Sathankulam, and Tiruchendur taluks, Palayakayal are all sources.

Politics  

|}

Administrative divisions
Thoothukudi District is divided into three revenue divisions and ten taluks. There are forty-one revenue firkas and 480 revenue villages.

The district is divided into twelve revenue blocks for rural and urban development. The twelve revenue blocks are Thoothukudi, Tiruchendur, Udangudi, Sathankulam, Thiruvaikundam, Alwarthirunagari, Karunkulam, Ottapidaram, Kovilpatti, Kayathar, Vilathikulam, and Pudur. The district has one municipal corporation: Thoothukudi; three municipalities: Kayalpattinam, Kovilpatti and Tiruchendur; eighteen town panchayats: Alwarthirunagiri, Arumuganeri, Athur, Eral, Ettayapuram, Kadambur, Kalugumalai, Kanam, Kayatharu, Nazerath, Perungulam, Sathankulam, Sayapuram, Srivaikuntam, Thenthiruperai, Udangudi, V. Pudur and Vilathikulam and 403 panchayat villages.

Villages
 

Nangaimozhi

Parliamentary Lok Sabha Constituency

Tamil Nadu Assembly Constituencies

Economy
The V. O. Chidambaranar Port Trust contributes majorly to the economy of the district besides providing employment. Thoothukudi hosts industries such as SPIC, Thoothukudi alkaline chemicals, DCW zirconium plant and numerous salt packing companies. Many coal based power plants are at various stages of commissioning. Kovilpatti consists of many small sized industry especially match stick industries.

Agriculture
Paddy is the most cultivated crop in most of the villages like Uzhakkudi, Vallanadu, Aarumugamangalam, Palayakayal, Thiruvaikundam, Sattankulam and Tiruchendur taluks. Cumbu, Cholam, Kuthiraivali and other pulses are raised in the dry tracts of Kovilpatti, Vilathikulam, Nagalapuram Ottapidaram, and Thoothukudi taluks. Cotton is cultivated in Kovilpatti, Ottapidaram and Thoothukudi Taluks. Groundnut cultivation is undertaken in Kovilpatti, Tiruchendur, and Sattankulam taluks. Groundnut cake is being used as manure and cattle feed. Nagalapuram makes its economy to be solely dependent agriculture. Sugarcane and Plantain (Banana) are cultivated on a large scale along the stretch of Uzhakkudi. Banana and Beetel cultivation is more prominent in villages like Aarumugamanagalam and Yeral. Also vegetables like tomato, chillies, brinjal, lady's finger, beans are cultivated in village of Uzhakkudi. Summers are made use to cultivate cotton on a smaller scale. Main business of this area is dry chilly, cholam, cumbu, wood charcoal, etc.
With 35% share, the district is the top producer of Cumbu in Tamil Nadu. Palmyrah trees are grown mostly in Tiruchendur, Srivaikundam, Sattankulam and Vilathikulam taluks. Jaggery is produced from palmyrah juice; the production of jaggery is the main occupation of the people of Tiruchendur and Sattankulam taluks. Banana and other vegetables are raised in Srivaikundam and Tiruchendur taluks.

Salt production
The district constitutes 70 percent of the total salt production of Tamil Nadu and 30 percent of that of India. Tamil Nadu is the second largest producer of Salt in India next to Gujarat.

Transport
National Highway 45B, 7A and State Highways SH-32,33,40,44,75,76,77,93,176 connect to other parts of the State. Government buses connect the district with other parts of state. Thoothukudi and Kovilpatti railway station are the major stations of Indian Railways. V.O. Chidambaranar Port Authority in the district was declared as the tenth major seaport in India also provides container services. Tuticorin Airport is situated at Vaigaikulam and currently has flights to and from Chennai and Bengaluru. Thoothukudi is the one of the cities which is having four ways of transportation (Roadways, Railways, Airways and Seaways).

Spaceport
The Government of India is to set up a new Rocket launch pad near Kulasekaranpattinam in Thoothukudi district. The Indian Space Research Organisation (ISRO) has begun work on its second Rocket launching pad or Spaceport, which will be Kulasekaranpattinam, Thoothukudi in Tamil Nadu. Like the Sriharikota spaceport in the Satish Dhawan Space Centre, Thoothukudi was selected as a spaceport due to its nearness to the equator. "A rocket launch site should be on the east coast and near the equator. And Thoothukudi district satisfies that condition", a former ISRO official stated.

Education
There are numerous educational institutions, colleges, schools providing education. The Agricultural College and Research Institute, Killikulam was established in 1984 – 85 as the third constituent College of Tamil Nadu Agricultural University. These include:

Notable people
 Angela Lincy, Sportsperson who set the national record of 1.72m in high jump at the National games in Thiruvananthapuram at the age of 15.
 Appukutty, Film actor
 Beela Rajesh, Former Health and Family Welfare Secretary of Tamil Nadu
 Charle, Film actor
 Cottalango Leon, Oscar awardee
 Dinesh Karthik, National cricketer
 Hari, Film director
 J. Kanakaraj, Former State Election Commissioner of Andhra Pradesh
 J. P. Chandrababu, Film actor
 Jaguar Thangam, Film stunt choreographer
 K. P. Kandasamy, Founder of the dinakaran newspaper group
 Ki. Rajanarayanan, Tamil folklorist and writer
 Ku. Alagirisami, Tamil writer
 Kadambur M. R. Janarthanan, Former Union Minister of State for Personnel, Public Grievances and Pensions
 Kaali Venkat, Film actor
 Kumaragurupara Desikar, Poet and Saivite ascetic
 Mari Selvaraj, Film director
 Maveeran Alagumuthu Kone, Freedom fighter
 Naveen Raja Jacob, Volleyball sportsperson
 Nivetha Pethuraj, Film actress
 Oomaithurai, Indian Poligar
 P. Rajagopal, Founder of Saravana Bhavan
 P. Sri Acharya, Tamil scholar
 Pon Mariappan, Barber who equipped his salon with mini library and got appreciated by PM Narendra Modi in the "Mann Ki Baat" radio programme
 Poomani, Tamil writer and receiver of Sahitya Akademi for his work Agnaadi
 R. Nallakannu, Politician and social activist
 R. Parthiban, Film actor
 Ramanichandran, Tamil romance novelist
 Rajendran, Film actor and stunt double
 S. P. Adithanar, Founder of the Dina Thanthi newspaper group
 S. Anantharamakrishnan, Founder of Amalgamations Group
 Shenbaga, Film actress
 Shiv Nadar, Founder of HCL Technologies
 Sivanthi Aditanar, Tamil media baron
 Stunt Silva, Film stunt actor
 Subramanya Bharathi, Freedom fighter and writer
 Thengai Srinivasan, Film actor
 T. S. Balaiah, Film actor
 Umaru Pulavar, Tamil poet
 V. O. Chidambaram Pillai, Freedom fighter
 Veeran Sundaralingam, Freedom fighter
 Vanchinathan, Freedom fighter
 Veerapandiya Kattabomman, Freedom fighter
 Vivekh, Film actor and social activist

See also
 Thoothukudi massacre
 Custodial death of P Jayaraj and Bennicks
 V. O. Chidambaranar Port Trust
 Tuticorin Airport
 List of districts of Tamil Nadu

References

External links

 Thoothukudi corporation
 Thoothukudi District

 
Districts of Tamil Nadu
Thoothukudi
Gulf of Mannar